Okoth is a surname. Notable people with the surname include:

Benard Otieno Okoth, Kenyan politician
Clive Okoth (born c. 1982), Ugandan airline pilot
John Eliud Okoth (born 1958), Kenyan field hockey player
Ken Okoth (1978-2019), Kenyan politician
Nick Okoth (born 1983), Kenyan amateur boxer 
Yona Okoth (1926-2001), Ugandan Anglican archbishop
Zacchaeus Okoth (born 1942), Kenyan Roman Catholic archbishop